FK Vardar Skopje, or simply Vardar, is a football club based in the capital city of Skopje, North Macedonia. The club was founded in 1947 and currently competes in the Macedonian Second Football League. They are the most successful club in Macedonian football, having won eleven Macedonian First League titles, five Macedonian Cups, two Macedonian Super Cups, and one Yugoslav Cup. In 2017, they became the first Macedonian club to qualify for European competitions.

History

Beginning
After WW2 FK Vardar was established with the merger of city rivals FK Pobeda (1919) and FK Makedonija (1922), in the hall of cinema "Vardar" on 22 July 1947. The foundation assembly had decided the club's color to be blue and it was, but already at the next assembly the decision was changed to red and white. FK Pobeda has competed in the first season of the Federal League after the World War II, finished at the eighth place and won the relegation playoffs against FK Sloga from Novi Sad, FK Vardar was a member of the Federal league from the very beginning. However, during the following decade they were several times relegated and promoted back again. The present recognizable red and black color jerseys were brought back again after the 1963 Skopje earthquake when the famous Milan football club sent equipment for the Skopje's team.

First Federal League
The club won its first major trophy in the 1960–61 Yugoslav Cup. Many famous players from the region started their careers at Vardar, and their triumph in the Yugoslav Cup was a highlight. The leader of that particular generation of players was Andon Dončevski, who later coached the team from 1985 to 1988. Due to massive irregularities during the last 34th week of fixtures, the 1985–86 Yugoslav First League season ended notoriously. Football Association of Yugoslavia headed by Slavko Šajber voided the last week's results ordering a replay of all 9 fixtures. Twelve clubs were docked 6 points due to alleged participation in the match-fixing scandal. All teams agreed to replay their games but FK Partizan, who had won the title with a 4–0 over FK Željezničar Sarajevo, refused, after which the game was awarded 3–0 to FK Željezničar Sarajevo, which gave Red Star Belgrade the title. Red Star Belgrade played in the 1986–87 European Cup. However, after a sequence of legal processes, the original final table, with FK Partizan as champions, was officially recognized in 1987. The following 1986-87 Federal League season saw 10 teams starting with -6 points. Vardar Skopje, who had not been deducted 6 points, won the title, and participated in the 1987–88 European Cup, but the points deduction was later annulled after more legal proceedings, and the title was given to FK Partizan, who headed the table with the deduction. But for UEFA, Vardar was recognized as a champion.  In 1986–87 Federal League team had a group of wonderful players, led by the talented Darko Pančev and including Ilija Najdoski, Dragi Kanatlarovski and Vujadin Stanojković. FK Vardar went on to spend 33 seasons in the Federal top flight from 1947 to 1992 and is ranked 11th on the all-time table.

After independence
Vardar celebrated Macedonia independence by winning three consecutive titles including going unbeaten in the inaugural season. During the 90's they remained at the top of Macedonian football reaching five Cup finals; winning four and have always been the team to beat. After a lean spell by their standards, they brought the league again in 2001–02 and the following season just missed out on qualifying for the 2003–04 UEFA Champions League group stage. A remarkable achievement, in the Second qualifying round they eliminated CSKA Moscow and came within a goal of getting past Sparta Prague. In 2011, Vardar was originally relegated from the Macedonian First Football League, but after a buying the license from Miravci it stayed. The following season they brought the league again after nine years. To date they have 17 major honors to their name. In 2012, with the new transformation, FK Vardar became the first team in North Macedonia organized as a joint stock company incorporated under the Companies Act. FK Vardar went on to spend 24 seasons in the Macedonian First Football League from 1992 to 2017 and is ranked first on the all-time table.

Memorable moments
In their history, FK Vardar has had many memorable matches. The first big one came in 1961 against Dunfermline from Scotland, victory at home ground 2:0 glorious moments in Cup winners Cup. Among those, the one that stands out the most was defeating FK Partizan by a score of 5–0. In early history, the 2–1 victory over Varteks in the Yugoslav Cup final is remembered by the club as its first major trophy win. A game that had the highest attendance was a matchup against Trepča where FK Vardar won 2–1 and earned promotion to the Yugoslav First League. Other matches to remember came against the great four Red Star Belgrade, Partizan Belgrade, Dinamo Zagreb and Hajduk Split. Then 1985 home ground victory over Dinamo Bucurset from Romania 1:0 in UEFA Cup competition.  At the beginning of the Macedonian First Football League the most memorable matches were all the wins against rival Pelister, including the first-ever Macedonian Football Cup final in 1993 where FK Vardar won 1–0 at the old City Stadium. The biggest international achievement of the club came in 2003 when FK Vardar came one goal short of qualifying for the UEFA Champions League group stage. They had great match against Barry Town from Wales and 3–0 victory at home ground, then another glorious 2–1 away win over Russian heavyweights CSKA Moscow. In 2004 UEFA Intertoto Cup they destroyed Ethnikos Achnas from Cyprus in both matches home and away with identical victories of 5–1, then 1–0 victory against Belgian side Gent at home ground.

First time in Europa League group stage 
In the 2017–18 Champions League second qualifying round, Vardar were drawn against Swedish side Malmö FF, in the first leg away, they have played a draw (1–1) and won the second leg in Strumica (3–1), with the goals of Boban Grncharov, Tigran Barseghyan and Boban Nikolov. In the third qualifying round, Vardar was played against Danish side F.C. Copenhagen, they won first leg at the home in Skopje (1–0), with the goal of Jonathan Balotelli. In the second leg in Copenhagen, Vardar had a result which would lead to the play-off round of Champions League, but in last 15 minutes, Copenhagen scored two goals, and Vardar lost the match (4–1), and its eliminated from the Champions League. But, the participation in the European competitions in that season Vardar continued in the Europa League play-off round, in whom were drawn against Turkish giants Fenerbahçe. Surprisingly, Vardar won both matches against them, in the first leg in Skopje won 2–0, with the goals of Barseghyan and the bizarre own goal of Mehmet Topal, and in the second leg in Istanbul 2–1, with a goals of Jaba Jighauri and Nikola Gligorov, and Vardar qualified for the group stage of the Europa League for the first time in its history and became the first Macedonian club to qualify for the group stage of a European competition. In the group stage, Vardar were drawn in Group L against Zenit Saint Petersburg, Rosenborg and Real Sociedad. In the debut match, Vardar were outclassed by Zenit in Skopje (0–5) and lost the match in Trondheim against Rosenborg (3–1), but was scored first goal in the group stages of European competition by Juan Felipe. In third match Vardar was again trashed by Real Sociedad at home (0–6), which was a highest defeat in the European competition matches. 
However, FК Vardar later won a historic first point in European Cups with a 1:1 draw in the home match against Rosenborg BK.

Grounds

Gradski Park Arena

The Toshe Proeski Arena with a capacity of 33,460 spectators, it ranks among the 10 biggest stadiums in the Balkans. The field is of 105 x 68 m dimensions. There are two big boards that are located on the east and west sides, size 18 × 6 m. The Toshe Proeski Arena has 494 VIP seats and 386 seats for the media on the northern stand. 80% of the space in Toshe Proeski Arena is sheltered in case of bad weather. The Toshe Proeski Arena is a multifunctional sports facility located in Skopje, Macedonia. It is named after Philip II of Macedon and is mostly used for football matches. On 25 July 2012, one of the most visited matches of FK Vardar against FC BATE Borisov was played in the second qualifying round of the 2012–13 UEFA Champions League. The west stand is known by the Komiti, FK Vardar's most faithful fans.
National Arena Toshe Proeski was the host of 2017 UEFA Super Cup, Macedonia's first UEFA club competition final.

Hipodrom Training Ground
The Hipodrom Training Ground training camp of is one of the most impressive football facilities, built not only on the territory of Macedonia and the surrounding region. Designed according to modern facilities which are at the disposal of the strongest European teams, this complex provides FK Vardar's first team players with all necessary conditions for the normal training process. Having in use the training center which cost 4 million €, the Vardar footballers received the following benefits offered by their new professional home:
Two football fields, one of which is artificial and one natural base and most sophisticated drainage system, which allows top condition for the training in all weather conditions.  Both pitches are lit with spotlights, which provides the opportunity for our first team players and coaching staff to perform their daily duties in the evening.
16 rooms and three suites designed for daily and quarantine residence of the players and the technical staff of the most successful domestic club.
Room for theoretical and video analysis of the opponents.
Restaurant for footballers, and coffee shop that also can be used by visitors to the facility.
Medical Center
Spa Center
Rooms for individual analysis and discussions
Premises for professional staff
The facility is located in the Skopje suburb of Hippodrome on the east entrance of the city, near the complex intended to foster Equestrian sports.

Considering that the existence of adequate infrastructure is the most fundamental prerequisite for the football game FC Vardar received a modern training camp as it has long deserved. Simply, our present and future, the coaches and the footballers, right on this place will build, time and adjust the form, which is supposed to soar Vardar to the desired heights on the international stage in European competitions.

The longtime dream of generations of Vardar fans, for ranking in the group stage of the Champions League and the Europe League, we could now rightly say, that from day to day will start turning into reality. The first step towards a given target has been made with the implementation of the plan for the construction of the "red-black" professional training center.

Vardar Football Academy
The FK Vardar Football Academy is one of the most modern sports facilities intended for work with youth categories, which are built not only on the territory of Macedonia, but in the surrounding region. As an institution for development of young football talents, the work of the academy is organized according to the standards of the famous clubs of Europe's elite. The Secrets of the football game under the guidance of their coaches and other professionals, will be learned by more than 400 boys, juniors of the most successful Macedonian club.
Football pitch with artificial grass, an area of 8700 m2 and dimensions of 130 meters in length and 65 in width. The terrain is also illuminated by spotlights to enable our juniors to train in the evening.
Four dressing rooms for the footballers and two dressing rooms for coaches with a surface of 50 m2, equipped with central ventilation and underfloor heating.
Classroom for theoretical instruction and sports education, covering 70 m2 and a capacity for 30 people.
Offices for administration
Economy Office
Technical and auxiliary premises
A lot of top proven footballers came from the famous Vardar Football School in the time of the history, and this is witnessed by the numerous trophies won in the junior competitions of the Macedonian and the ex-Yugoslavia scene.
Now, with the new working conditions, Vardar will be a regional leader in the creation of new football "pearls" that will successfully carry the jersey of our club and the national team of North Macedonia in the coming period.
Guided by the thought that children are our greatest treasure and that the future belongs to them, investing in their football development and building of sports habits, has always been and will remain our top strategic priority.

Supporters

FK Vardar supporters are known as "Komiti". Komiti are the first organized supporters group of Vardar and they were founded on 4 June 1987 in Skopje, at the match between FK Vardar and Red Star Belgrade. Throughout their existence, they left significant seal in the history of Vardar and with their support becoming the 12th player of the team. FK Vardar as a club is supported by most Macedonians worldwide. The Ultras group KOMITI was noticed for the first time in the year 1985, on 'Zapad' (West Stand), where the most fanatic fans of Vardar always operated. Two years later, on 4 June 1987 at the City Stadium in Skopje was a derby match of the Yugoslav league at that time between Vardar Skopje and Red Star Belgrade (3:1). On 'Zapad' for the first time since the existence of the club, a banner with the writing 'KOMITI' was noticed. The idea contained the establishment of a massive and strong Macedonian ultra scene. The goal was for 'KOMITI' to make the prominent post of all activities and events on the West Stand. As the most acceptable name of the group was selected 'KOMITI'.

The reason for it was simple: In the last decade of the 19th century and the early 20th century, when Macedonia was still under Ottoman rule, the revolutionaries that had been organized under IMRO were called komitadjis, as in members of the Macedonian Committee. This name is very strong and the meaning of the name is closely linked with their goals, this is why they decided not to use one like the standard unimaginative names such as Brigate, Commando, Ultras, Boys, etc. And so, the name 'KOMITI' was selected for the newborn Ultra group.

The team has always been a symbol of the Macedonians and in the diaspora. Komiti have great relations with FK Teteks fans "Vojvodi" and FC Schalke 04 fans "Ultras Gelsenkirchen".

Rivalries

Eternal Derby

The fixture between Vardar and FK Pelister is the biggest and most violent match in North Macedonia. An important aspect of this match-up is the intense rivalry in the Macedonian tifo scene between the supporter clubs Komiti Skopje and Čkembari. The rivalry began in the season 1989–90 at a match in Skopje, between FK Vardar and Red Star Belgrade. A conflict occurred between the "Skopje fans" and a few "Bitola fans" who went to cheer for FK Vardar, who at that time was the most popular Macedonian football club in the former Yugoslavia. On 8 March 1991 in Bitola FK Pelister and FK Vardar met in the Yugoslav second league and the first incident occurred. From that day forward, started the big rivalry between Komiti and Čkembari along with the Vardar–Pelister match becoming the eternal derby. In recent years the rivalry wained slightly in importance as FK Vardar stopped being as competitive.

Skopje derby
FK Vardar and FK Shkupi (formerly defunct FK Sloga Jugomagnat) is the main derby in the city, as both clubs have active organised support. This rivalry is drawn along ethnic lines as FK Vardar fans are Macedonians and Orthodox Christians, while FK Shkupi are Albanians . Rabotnički is the other team in Skopje with organised fans, although the rivalry is rarely manifested on the football pitch, it is widely upheld however in handball and basketball.

Inter-regional rivalries
Vardar has a strong rivalry with KF Shkëndija. Like the rivalry with FK Shkupi, this rivalry is also drawn along ethnic lines as KF Shkëndija fans are Albanians. There is also a friendly "brotherhood derby" with FK Teteks the fans of these two clubs have been dubbed as "Orthodox Brothers".

Honours

Domestic League

Macedonian First League
Winners (11): 1992–93, 1993–94, 1994–95, 2001–02, 2002–03, 2011–12, 2012–13, 2014–15, 2015–16, 2016–17, 2019–20

Domestic Cup
 Macedonian Football Cup
Winners (5): 1992–93, 1994–95, 1997–98, 1998–99, 2006–07
Macedonian Football Supercup
Winners (2): 2013, 2015
Yugoslav Cup
Winners (1): 1960–61
Macedonian Republic Cup
Winners (12): 1955–56, 1965–66, 1966–67, 1967–68, 1968–69, 1969–70, 1970–71, 1971–72, 1972–73, 1979–80, 1980–81, 1992–93

Regional Cup

Balkan Cup 

 Winners (2): 1972-73, 1973-74, 1980-1981

European history

FK Vardar's first competitive European match was a 0–5 loss against Dunfermline Athletic in the 1961–62 European Cup Winners' Cup. Muarem Zekir holds the record for most appearances in Europe for the club with 21. Top scorer in UEFA club competitions is Wandeir with 13 goals. The biggest win in UEFA competition was against Ethnikos Achna FC in the 2004 Intertoto Cup defeating them twice by the score of 5–1 and 10–2 on aggregate.

FK Vardar became the first Macedonian club to qualify for the group stages of a European competition, after beating Fenerbahçe S.K. in the 2017–18 UEFA Europa League playoffs.

Regional Competitions

UEFA ranking

Players

Current squad

Club officials

Technical staff

Board members

Club records

 Most goals scored: Andon Dončevski (217 goals).
 Best goal scoring ratio: Darko Pančev 207 matches/132 goals (0,65 goals per match).
 Most league goals scored: Vasil Ringov (97 goals).
 Most league goals scored in one Macedonian First League season: Saša Ćirić 1992–93 (36 goals).
 Most goals scored in European competition: Wandeir 2003–05 (12 goals).
 Most appearances: Kočo Dimitrovski 845 (416 league matches), Metodije Spasovski 647 (375 league matches), Gjore Jovanovski 486 (271 league matches).
 Most accomplished coach: Gjoko Hadžievski (5 league titles and 2 national cups).
 Biggest win in Macedonian league: 30 May 1993, FK Vardar 11–0 FK Vardarski.
 Biggest win in UEFA competition: 19 June 2004, Ethnikos Achnas 1–5 FK Vardar.
 Biggest single game attendance: 1985–86 Yugoslav First League, FK Vardar–Red Star Belgrade (30,000 spectators). FK. Vardar-FC. Bate Borisov 0:0 (31.322 spectators) First Round Champions League (2012–2013)

References

External links

Official website 

 
Football clubs in Yugoslavia
Association football clubs established in 1947
Football clubs in Skopje
1947 establishments in the Socialist Republic of Macedonia